The 1923 Milan–San Remo was the 16th edition of the Milan–San Remo cycle race and was held on 25 March 1923. The race started in Milan and finished in San Remo. The race was won by Costante Girardengo, his third of six wins.

General classification

References

1923
1923 in road cycling
1923 in Italian sport
March 1923 sports events